The following is a list of standing committees of the Icelandic parliament.

See also
List of Icelandic ministries
Government agencies in Iceland

List
Standing committees of the Icelandic parliament